Clarence Perkins "Pat" Parker (May 22, 1893 – March 21, 1967) was an American Major League Baseball right fielder who played for the St. Louis Browns in . He did not play much in the majors, only playing in three games in 1915. He made six plate appearances, going 1-6 (.167), with three strikeouts. He did not make an error in his three games.

He is in a selected group of players to play at Wahconah Park and go on to play in the Majors.

External links
Baseball Reference.com

1893 births
1967 deaths
St. Louis Browns players
Baseball players from Massachusetts
Major League Baseball right fielders
Pittsfield Electrics players
Lowell Grays players
St. Croix Downeasters players